Stade Malien is a Malian basketball team based in Bamako. It is part of the multi-sports club, which also has a football team and rugby team. Founded in 1960, Stade plays in the Ligue 1, the highest level of basketball in Mali. In 2023, Stade will play in the Basketball Africa League (BAL). 

The team reached the FIBA Africa Club Champions Cup finals twice, in 1972 and 1989. Both finals were lost, to Red Star Ndongo and ASEC Mimosas respectively. 

After last appearing in international competitions in 2007, Stade Malien will play in the 2023 season of the Basketball Africa League (BAL), after finishing third in the West Division of the Road to BAL.

Honours

National 
Ligue 1

 Champions (4): 2003, 2004, 2014, 2022

Malian Cup

 Winners: 2014, 2022

Malian Super Cup

 Winners: 2012, 2023

International 
FIBA Africa Champions Cup

 Runners-up (2): 1972, 1989
 Third place (1): 1981
 Fourth place (1): 1996
Road to BAL

 Third place (1): 2023

Players

2022 roster

Notable players 

  Salimata Dembélé
  Mamadou Keita

In the Basketball Africa League

References 

Basketball teams in Mali
Basketball teams established in 1960
Sport in Bamako
Road to BAL teams
Basketball Africa League teams